Gönczi (adjective form of Göncz, a magyarized form of Kunz and other descendants of the German male given name Konrad like Kunze, Kunzel, Kunzler or Künzler) is a Hungarian surname of patronymic or toponymic origin. It may refer to:
 Anna Gönczi (born 1959), Hungarian sports shooter
 Ferenc Gönczi (1935–2009), Hungarian sports shooter
 Róbert Gönczi (1951–2000), Hungarian boxer
 Vera Gönczi (born 1969), Hungarian alpine skier

References

Hungarian-language surnames
Patronymic surnames
Toponymic surnames